Tecticrater finlayi is a species of very small deepwater limpet, a marine gastropod mollusc in the family Lepetellidae.

Distribution
This marine species is endemic to New Zealand.

References

 Powell A. W. B., New Zealand Mollusca, William Collins Publishers Ltd, Auckland, New Zealand 1979 

Lepetellidae
Gastropods of New Zealand
Gastropods described in 1937
Taxa named by Arthur William Baden Powell
Endemic fauna of New Zealand
Endemic molluscs of New Zealand